Germany was represented by the band Wind, with the song "Für alle", at the 1985 Eurovision Song Contest, which took place on 4 May in Gothenburg, Sweden. "Für alle" was the winner of the German national final, held on 21 March. This was the first of three appearances by Wind at Eurovision; they would also represent Germany in 1987 and 1992.

Before Eurovision

Ein Lied für Göteborg
The final was held at the Deutsches Theater in Munich, hosted by Wolfgang Mascher and Margit Geissler. 12 songs took part and the winner was chosen by a panel of approximately 500 people who had been selected as providing a representative cross-section of the German public.

At Eurovision 
On the night of the final Wind performed 10th in the running order, following Portugal and preceding Israel. Pre-contest betting had rated "Für alle" as the favourite for victory, and for a large part of the voting it appeared to be living up to its billing. Germany took the lead after Cyprus, voting third, awarded a maximum 12 to the song, and held it until five rounds from the end and the Swiss vote. Switzerland had historically proven themselves very reluctant to vote for German entries – it was widely believed in Germany that the Swiss jury had cost them victory in the 1981 contest – and lived up to expectations by failing to award any points to "Für alle", allowing Sweden briefly, and then Norway, to take over the lead. At the close of voting "Für alle" had received 105 points, placing Germany second. The overall voting suggested it was a song that juries liked either a great deal or not at all; of the other 18 national juries, eleven placed the song in their top 4, while two gave it low rankings and five gave it no points at all. Pointedly, two of those juries were the two other German-speaking countries, Austria and Switzerland (the others were Greece, Italy, and Turkey). The German jury awarded its 12 points to eventual contest winners Norway.

Voting

References

1985
Countries in the Eurovision Song Contest 1985
Eurovision